Catolechia is a genus of lichen-forming fungi in the family Rhizocarpaceae. It is a monotypic genus, containing the single species Catolechia wahlenbergii. The genus was circumscribed by German botanist Julius von Flotow in 1850. He did not assign a type species for the genus; Catolechia pulchella  was designated as the type by Gustav Wilhelm Körber in 1855. This species is synonymous with Catolechia wahlenbergii.

Several species that were originally described as a member of Catolechia have since been transferred to other genera. Examples include:
Catolechia flavovirescens  = Arthrorhaphis citrinella
Catolechia glomerulans  = Monerolechia glomerulans
Catolechia lactea  = Buellia lactea
Catolechia marginulata  = Buellia marginulata
Catolechia moriopsis  = Orphniospora moriopsis
Catolechia pyxinoides  = Pyxine pyxinoides
Catolechia subcoronata  = Buellia subcoronata
Catolechia tenuis  = Dimelaena tenuis
Catolechia wahlenbergii ß alpina  = Bellemerea alpina

References

Rhizocarpaceae
Lichen genera
Monotypic Lecanoromycetes genera
Taxa described in 1850
Taxa named by Julius von Flotow